The 1953–54 season was Newport County's seventh consecutive season in the Third Division South since relegation from the Second Division at the end of the 1946–47 season. It was the club's 25th season in the third tier and 26th season overall in the Football League.

Season review

Results summary

Results by round

Fixtures and results

Third Division South

FA Cup

Welsh Cup

League table

External links
 Newport County 1953-1954 : Results
 Newport County football club match record: 1954
 Welsh Cup 1953/54

References

 Amber in the Blood: A History of Newport County. 

1953-54
English football clubs 1953–54 season
1953–54 in Welsh football